Cal Tech may refer to:

 California Institute of Technology (Caltech)
 Cal Tech (calculator)